Epping Boys High School is a government high school located at Marsfield, New South Wales, Australia, which was established in 1957. The current principal is Jessica Schadel.

Achievements 
As well as high achievements in the creative and performing arts, the school has a strong sporting and academic record. The school has been placed on the Centre of Excellence program.

On 15 April 2010 the school hosted a Community Cabinet meeting chaired by the Prime Minister of Australia, Kevin Rudd.

In the 2016/17 cricket season, Epping Boys High School won both the Challenge Cup and Allan Davidson Shield, defeating Figtree High and Endeavour Sports High respectively.

School style 
The school traditionally uses green and gold in its logo and student uniforms. The main uniform include dark grey trousers/shorts, a variety of green jackets, grey socks, black leather shoes and a shirt with the school logo (grey shirt for juniors [years 7–9] and white shirts for seniors [years 10–12]). The school tie for junior students consists of gold stripes on green with white stripes and school logo, while that for senior students consists of gold school logo printed on a pure green background.    

The school also follows a structured PBL system with specific awards, some of which include the bronze, silver and gold badges, a green PBL tie and a principal's award. Students can receive "positive incidents", and at certain milestones students receive the awards.

Houses 
The school has four houses, which are based upon prominent figures of Eastwood, Epping, Marsfield and Ryde during the 19th Century. Pupils competing in sport, academic and other various events earn points for their houses. At the end of the year, the house with the most points win the house cup. The houses are:
 Darvall (red)
 Harris (yellow)
 Midson (blue)
 Terry (green)

Alumni 
 John Abernethy – NSW State Coroner (2000–2007)
 Mark Anderson AM - services to secondary education in NSW
 Adam Biddle – former Sydney FC football player
 Mark Calder - Anglican Bishop of Bathurst
 John Cartmill – Professor of Surgery at Australian School of Advanced Medicine, Macquarie University
Ed Craig - U20 Australian Rugby Union player in the 2016 U-20 Rugby World Cup in Manchester, England 
 Iva Davies – musician, lead singer of Icehouse
 Stuart Dickinson – former rugby referee, most capped Australian referee at international level
 Michael Ebeid – chief executive of SBS 2011-2018
 Sam Gallagher – U20 Socceroos player in the 2009 FIFA U-20 World Cup
 Brendan Kerry – figure skater
 Kevin Kim – member/lead vocal of South Korean boy band ZE:A
 Paul Murray – Sky News Australia presenter
 Jack Newton – professional golfer
 Brett Papworth – Wallaby
 Ezio Rizzardo, awarded the 2011 Prime Minister's Prize for Science
 Geoffrey Robertson – QC and Rhodes Scholar (1970)
 Craig Shipley – baseball player, second Australian to play Major League Baseball
 Jordan Simpson – BSC Young Boys football player
 Tyler Simpson – former Queensland Roar and Perth Glory football player
 Ryan Teague - F.C. Famalicão football player - U17 Joeyroos Captain
 Alex Wilkinson – Footballer for Sydney FC and the Socceroos

See also 
 List of Government schools in New South Wales

References

External links 
 Epping Boys High School website

Educational institutions established in 1957
Public high schools in Sydney
Boys' schools in New South Wales
1957 establishments in Australia
Marsfield, New South Wales